Delafield is a town in Waukesha County, Wisconsin, United States. The population was 8,095 at the 2020 census. The City of Delafield is adjacent to the town. The unincorporated community of Buena Vista is located in the town.

History
The town of Delafield was originally named "Nemahbin".  The name was changed in the 4th Wisconsin Territorial Assembly in 1844.

Geography
According to the United States Census Bureau, the town has a total area of 20.8 square miles (53.7 km2), of which, 18.6 square miles (48.3 km2) of it is land and 2.1 square miles (5.5 km2) of it (10.22%) is water.

Demographics

As of the census of 2000, there were 7,820 people, 2,521 households, and 2,137 families residing in the town. The population density was 419.7 people per square mile (162.1/km2). There were 2,625 housing units at an average density of 140.9 per square mile (54.4/km2).  The racial makeup of the town was 93.94% White, 3.47% Black or African American, 0.24% Native American, 0.77% Asian, 0.50% from other races, and 1.09% from two or more races.  Some 1.78% of the population were Hispanic or Latino of any race.

There were 2,521 households, out of which 42.0% had children under the age of 18 living with them, 79.5% were married couples living together, 3.8% had a female householder with no husband present, and 15.2% were non-families. About 11.2% of all households were made up of individuals, and 3.2% had someone living alone who was 65 years of age or older. The average household size was 2.93 and the average family size was 3.19.

In the town, the population was spread out, with 32.4% under the age of 18, 5.6% from 18 to 24, 24.7% from 25 to 44, 30.7% from 45 to 64, and 6.6% who were 65 years of age or older. The median age was 39 years. For every 100 females, there were 112.2 males. For every 100 females age 18 and over, there were 100.9 males.

The median income for a household in the town was $98,779, and the median income for a family was $107,486. Males had a median income of $70,136 versus $35,216 for females. The per capita income for the town was $41,391. About 1.9% of families and 3.0% of the population were below the poverty line, including 3.5% of those under age 18 and 8.1% of those age 65 or over.

References

External links
 The Town of Delafield website

Towns in Waukesha County, Wisconsin
Towns in Wisconsin